Huang Zongxi's Law, or Theory of Huang Zongxi, is an observation made by Huang Zongxi (1610-1695) on how the burden of the peasants often increased rather than decreased during the various dynasties in Chinese history when attempts were made to reduce it. This theorem was summarized and named by the Chinese historian Qin Hui.

Qin Hui summarized Huang Zongxi's criticism of China's tax reforms of the past dynasties, exposing their shortcomings of "the ill of steady accumulation" (积累莫返之害) as the "Huang Zongxi's Law".

Definition
All the previous reforms aimed at reducing the tax burden on the peasants eventually pushed up the tax burden on the peasants, which is known as "Huang Zongxi's Law".

References 

Tax reform
Economic history of China